Rembert of Kerssenbrock (born 1474 in Bruch, Rhineland-Palatinate) was a German clergyman and bishop/prince for the Roman Catholic Archdiocese of Paderborn. He was ordained in 1547. He was appointed bishop in 1547. He died in 1568.

References 

1474 births
1568 deaths
German Roman Catholic bishops